The Leader of the Christian Social Union (Vorsitzender der Christlich-Sozialen Union) is the most senior political figure within the Christian Social Union in Bavaria. Since 19 January 2019, the office has been held by Markus Söder; who is the 9th leader of the party.

The Leader of the Christian Social Union is supported by a General Secretary, which since 2018 has been Markus Blume. Furthermore, the leader is supported by five deputy leaders, which currently are Kurt Gribl, Angelika Niebler, Dorothee Bär, Manfred Weber and Melanie Huml.

Leaders of the Christian Social Union (1945–present) 
A list of the 8 leaders since 1945

See also 

 Leader of the Social Democratic Party of Germany
 Leader of the Christian Democratic Union of Germany
 Social Democratic Party of Germany
 Christian Democratic Union of Germany
 Alliance '90/The Greens

Notes

References 

Lists of German politicians
Christian Social Union in Bavaria politicians